The Afghan-German Trading Company (DACOM; German: Deutsche-Afghanische Companie), originally known as the German and Oriental Trade House is a trading company which was established in 1923 by an association of German enterprises, which had its office in Kabul.

History 
In 1924, Ebner succeeded K. Wagner as chief local representative of DACOM.

In February 1925, DACOM was reported as doing a "fair amount" of business, acting as brokers for silvers for a new currency, and to have placed orders in Germany for wireless sets, machinery, and electrical materials. At this time, Ebner found himself in conflict with the Afghan government which only permitted him to trade with persons selected by the government.

By 1926, the German trading company had become one of the most successful in the country, second only to the Russian enterprises, and later on, it surpassed even them.

On 15 April 1929, during the Afghan civil war of 1928-29, Habibullāh Kalakāni contacted Muhammad Musa Khan Qandahari, a director of DACOM, and 7 other Qandaharis, requesting them to assassinate Amanullah Khan (who was contesting the Afghan throne), promising them a large reward if they did so.

As of 2011, the Afghan-German Trading Company still exists and is operating in Germany.

References 

Afghanistan–Germany relations
1923 establishments in Afghanistan
Afghan Civil War (1928–1929)